Sirupuliyur is a village in the Nannilam taluk of Thiruvarur district, Tamil Nadu, India.  The place is famous for the Sthalasayana Perumal Temple, a Hindu Temple dedicated to Lord Vishnu.

References 

Villages in Tiruvarur district